A skeuophoros ( "Βaggage carrier") was a slave or servant who carried baggage in Ancient Greece. Herodotus records that every hoplite was followed on campaign by a servant as a skeuophoros. In Aristophanes' play The Frogs, Xanthias, the slave of Dionysus, acts as his skeuophoros:

References

Military ranks of ancient Greece
Slavery in ancient Greece